In algebraic geometry, the Klein cubic threefold is the non-singular cubic threefold in 4-dimensional projective space given by the equation

Its automorphism group is the group PSL2(11) of order 660 . It is unirational but not a rational variety. 
 showed that it is birational to the moduli space of (1,11)-polarized abelian surfaces.

References

3-folds